Kalamış is a neighborhood on the bay of the same name in the district of Kadıköy on the Anatolian side of Istanbul, Turkey.

It is located between Kurbağalıdere, Kızıltoprak, Feneryolu and Fenerbahçe. It has a large marina and park. There are also some nightclubs and restaurants. Galatasaray Sports Club's Galatasaray Kalamış Facilities is also located there.

Kurbağalıdere flows into Kalamış Bay. Fenerbahçe Sports Club's Dereağzı Facilities are located at the point where Kurbağalıdere empties into the bay.

Kalamış is famous for its lyrics by Behçet Kemal Çağlar and the composition by Münir Nurettin Selçuk.

References 

Neighbourhoods of Kadıköy